Olof Palme (21 September 1884 - 3 April 1918), was a Finnish historian and the organizer of the voluntary Swedish Brigade in the 1918 Finnish Civil War. He was the uncle of Olof Palme, the prime minister of Sweden, who was murdered in 1986.

Life 
Palme was born in Porvoo, Finland as the son of the Swedish politician and artillery officer Sven Palme and Finnish Hanna von Born. He went to school in Stockholm and later studied history at the University of Uppsala. Palme took part of the archaeological excavations in the Medieval Sigtuna and was the founder of the 1916 established  Sigtuna museum.

Palme was known as a keen anti-socialist who was radicalized after the 1906 Hakaniemi riot in Helsinki. He was openly racist and has been described as a proto-fascist. In January 1918 Palme organized the voluntary Swedish Brigade to join the Finnish Civil War, fighting aside with the Finnish White Guards. He was killed by the Reds in the Battle of Tampere in April 1918. Palme was buried in Sigtuna.

Family 
Olof Palme was the brother of the military officer Nils Palme and the businessman Gunnar Palme (1886–1934), who was the father of the prime minister Olof Palme. He was married to Ola Tenow. The couple had five children, Sven Ulric Palme (1912–1977) was known as a historian and Rutger Palme (1910–1995) as a politician. Among his grandchildren can be found the professor and writer Jacob Palme, the ambassador and writer Thomas Palme, the architect and writer Erik Palme and the journalist and writer Christian Palme.

References 

1884 births
1918 deaths
20th-century Finnish historians
Finnish expatriates in Sweden
People from Porvoo
People of the Finnish Civil War (White side)
Swedish military personnel
Uppsala University alumni